Ruby Gloom is a Canadian animated television series based on the Mighty Fine apparel line of the same name created by illustrator Martin Hsu. Produced by Nelvana, the show aired on YTV from October 15, 2006 until June 1, 2008. 40 episodes were produced.

Overview
The show that focuses on the misadventures of a ragdoll-like girl named Ruby Gloom, along with her team of gothic friends - Doom Kitty, Iris, Misery, Skull Boy, Frank and Len, and Poe.

History

Franchise 
In 2001, Ruby Gloom began as a drawing on a piece of paper by illustrator Martin Hsu and was then spawned into a franchise by the U.S. company Mighty Fine three years later. Ruby Gloom began as a stationery line, and was featured on pencil cases, backpacks, clothing, key chains, and plush toys which were sold through Doeworld, a subsidiary of Mighty Fine.

Television series 
In early 2005, Martin Hsu sold the TV rights to Ruby Gloom to the Canadian animation studio Nelvana. In May 2005, the series was announced on the 2005 issue of Animation Magazine.

Main characters and casting 
Ruby Gloom (voiced by Sarah Gadon)
Doom Kitty
Iris (voiced by Stacey DePass)
Misery (voiced by Emily Hampshire; singing voice provided by Jeen O'Brien)
Skull Boy (voiced by Scott McCord)
Frank and Len (voiced by David Berni and Jeremy Harris respectively)
Poe (voiced by Adrian Truss)
Edgar and Allan
Scaredy Bat (voiced by Peter Keleghan)
Boo Boo (voiced by Barbara Mamabolo)
Mr. Buns (voiced by Dwayne Hill)

Episodes

Season 1 (2006–07)

Season 2 (2007)

Season 3 (2007–08)

Awards and honours 
Ruby Gloom was nominated for a Gemini Award in the category of "Best Animated Program or Series."

The script for episode "Yam Ween", written by Carolyn Bennett, was a finalist in the 2007 Canadian Screenwriting Awards.

Reception 
Ruby Gloom received generally positive reviews from both critics and audiences, praising it for its characters, writing, soundtrack, and plot. It would go on to garner a cult following.

Common Sense Media gave the series a rating of four stars out of five, saying: "A nice mix of sweet-and-sour, Ruby Gloom's dark gothic setting underscores all the cooperation and kindness. Adults will enjoy jokes that kids may miss, such as when it's revealed that Ruby eats Glum Flakes cereal for breakfast. And all but the most sensitive kids will be too enraptured by fantastic elements like talking pictures and a school for ghosts to be unnerved by dark elements like Misery's constant talk of disasters and death".

Telecast and home media
Ruby Gloom premiered on YTV in Canada on October 13, 2006, alongside the final episode's airing on June 1, 2008, with repeats until the early 2010s. Repeats are now airing on Nickelodeon Canada. In the United Kingdom, the series aired on Pop and Pop Girl in 2008. Irish network RTÉ Two aired the series in 2010. It also aired on 2x2 in Russia, Super RTL in Germany, Rai Gulp in Italy, RTP2 in Portugal, Pakapaka in Argentina and ABC1 and ABC3 in Australia in 2008. In Arab World, it aired on MBC 3 and Al-Majid Tv Network , and it also aired on Cartoon Network Japan in 2009.

DVD releases

Region 1 
Canada – There are two DVDs available from Nelvana (in association with the Corus-owned television network YTV). The DVDs present the episodes in NTSC 1.85:1 (16x9) anamorphic widescreen, with English Dolby Digital 5.1 sound and French Dolby Digital 2.0 sound. There are no subtitles nor closed captions. The opening title sequence on the DVDs is the full version, and not the edited version that airs on YTV.

The DVDs in release order are:

  Ruby Gloom: Grounded in Gloomsville – Contains the first four episodes of the series (as listed above), plus a behind-the-scenes special feature showing the voice recording of the episode "Hair(Less): The Musical" (parts 1 and 2).

  Ruby Gloom: Misery Loves Company – Contains the episodes "Iris Springs Eternal", "Poe-ranoia", "Skull Boys Don't Cry", and "Misery Loves Company", with no special features.

Following this, a third DVD entitled Ruby Gloom: Pet Poepulation was scheduled for release on September 9, 2009, but became unavailable.

U.S. – In 2013, kaBoom! Entertainment and Phase 4 Films released six Ruby Gloom DVDs in the U.S. Each disc contains four episodes, arranged as a continuous show, with the repeated opening songs and individual mini-episodes edited out. All of the mini-episodes are included separately as a bonus feature, instead of being incorporated in their main episode as originally broadcast.

The discs are as follows:

 Ruby Gloom: Happiest Girl in the World – Contains the episodes "Gloomer Rumor", "Doom With a View", "Missing Buns", and "Iris Springs Eternal".

 Ruby Gloom: I Heart Rock & Roll – Contains the episodes "Unsung Hero", "Quadra-gloomia", "Skull Boy's Don't Cry", and "Bad Hare Day".

 Ruby Gloom: Gloomates – Contains the episodes "Gloomates", "Seeing Eye to Eyes", "Name That Toon", and "Broken Records".

 Ruby Gloom: Grounded in Gloomsville – Contains the episodes "Grounded in Gloomsville", "Ruby Cubed", "Once in a Blue Luna", and "Time Flies".

 Ruby Gloom: Tooth or Dare – Contains the episodes "Tooth or Dare", "Skull in the Family", "Shaken. Not Scared", and "Misery Loves Company".

 Ruby Gloom: Welcome to Gloomsville – Contains the episodes "Venus de Gloomsville", "Science Fair or Foul", "Poe-Ranoia", and "Happy Yam Ween".

As with the Canadian release, the DVDs present the episodes in NTSC 1.85:1 (16x9) anamorphic widescreen, with English Dolby Digital 5.1 sound, but they have Spanish Dolby Digital 2.0 sound instead of French.

Brazil – Seasons one and two were released on three-disc DVD box sets; however, the box sets do not include all of the episodes from each season (despite the DVD covers indicating this). Both box sets are presented in NTSC 1.33:1 (4x3) full screen (the sides of the widescreen image are cut to create the full screen ratio, also known as pan and scan) with Portuguese and English Dolby Digital 5.1 sound. The opening title sequence is the edited version that airs on most television networks (such as the Canadian YTV). Neither the box set includes any special features.

The box sets are:

Ruby Gloom: Full season 1 – Contains the first thirteen episodes from season one.

Ruby Gloom: Full season 2 – Contains thirteen episodes (the remaining eight episodes from season one plus the first five episodes from season two).

Region 2 
France – Ruby Gloom: 1 is available from France Télévisions Distribution (in association with the television network France 3) and contains the first six episodes of the series (as listed above). The episodes are presented in PAL 1.33:1 (4x3) full screen (the sides of the widescreen image are cut to create the full screen ratio, also known as pan and scan) with French Dolby Digital 2.0 sound.

Germany – Two DVDs were made available from SPV GmbH (in association with the television network Super RTL) containing the first eight episodes of the series (as listed above), with each DVD consisting of four episodes. The episodes are presented in PAL 1.33:1 (4x3) full screen (the sides of the widescreen image are cut to create the full screen ratio, also known as pan and scan) with German Dolby Digital 2.0 sound.

On October 15, 2010, Edel Germany GmbH released Ruby Gloom – Willkommen in Gloomsville (Ruby Gloom – Welcome to Gloomsville), which contains the first seven episodes of the series (as listed above).

Japan – A DVD box set entitled Ruby Gloom's Bible is available from Sony Music Entertainment and contains 20 of the series' first 24 episodes (as listed above) in random order on five DVDs. The episodes are presented in NTSC 1.85:1 widescreen with Japanese Dolby Digital 2.0 sound.

United Kingdom – In the United Kingdom, Platform Entertainment Ltd. released a DVD.

Region 4 
Australia – There are four DVD volumes available from Magna Pacific containing the first 16 episodes of the series (as listed above), with each volume consisting of four episodes. The episodes are presented in PAL 1.33:1 (4x3) full screen (the sides of the widescreen image are cut to create the full screen ratio, also known as pan and scan) with English Dolby Digital 2.0 sound.

Online streaming
Currently, the series is now streaming on FilmRise Kids, Tubi and Pluto TV, but more recently, as of 2020, the series has become available on demand via YouTube.

References

External links 

 Official Ruby Gloom site
 Ruby Gloom on IMDb

2006 Canadian television series debuts
2008 Canadian television series endings
2000s Canadian animated television series
Animated television series about children
Canadian children's animated comic science fiction television series
Canadian children's animated science fantasy television series
Canadian children's animated horror television series
Canadian television shows based on children's books
English-language television shows
YTV (Canadian TV channel) original programming
Television series by Nelvana
Canadian children's animated drama television series
Canadian Screen Award-winning television shows